Jeremy Taylor is a writer, editor and publisher who was born in England and has lived and worked in Trinidad and Tobago in the Caribbean since 1971. In 1991, he co-founded the publishing company Media and Editorial Projects Limited (MEP).

Biography
Taylor attended King's Ely. He received his Bachelor of Arts degree in English from the University of Cambridge (1962–65), and then a Master of Arts and Diploma in Education from Makerere University in Uganda (1966–67). In Trinidad, he taught at Fatima College before starting as a freelance journalist with several local international publications. He established his own publishing company Media and Editorial Projects Limited in 1991.

For several years, Taylor was a regular Caribbean Correspondent for the BBC and The Times (London), a radio commentator at Radio Trinidad and Radio 95.1FM in Trinidad, a writer and presenter at the now defunct AVM Television and Trinidad & Tobago Television (TTT), and a regular columnist for the Trinidad and Tobago Express, Trinidad Guardian, Catholic News, and Nealco News. Canada-based journalist Jai Parasram, referring to Taylor's days as a regular newspaper and television critic, called Taylor "the number one television critic of the time".

Additionally, Taylor contributed to a number of international print and radio organisations, including The Observer (London), The Sunday Times, The New York Times, Encyclopædia Britannica, World Book Encyclopaedia, the CBC (Toronto), National Public Radio (Washington), CANA (Caribbean News Agency), and The New Internationalist.

In 1991, he co-founded Media and Editorial Projects Limited (MEP); he started its book imprint, Prospect Press, in 1994. He serves as Managing Director, and is either Editor or Consulting Editor on its publications. He also is a regular contributor to MEP's magazines: Caribbean Review of Books, Caribbean Beat and Discover Trinidad and Tobago. His published books include Going to Ground: Journalism 1972–1992, a collection of his essays, commentaries, radio pieces and reviews covering two decades.

Taylor was the Founding Secretary of the Caribbean Publishers Network (CAPNET), from 2000 to 2002). He was among the founding members of the organising committee for the first Bocas LitFest, the Trinidad & Tobago literary festival, in April/May 2011.

Bibliography
 Masquerade: A Visitor's Guide to Trinidad & Tobago (1986, Macmillan). Second edition: Trinidad and Tobago: An Introduction and Guide (1991, Macmillan)
 Trinidad and Tobago: A Souvenir in Pictures (1988, Macmillan)
 BWIA’s Caribbean: A Guide to 28 Caribbean Countries (1988, British West Indies Airways)
 Above and Beyond: A History of BWIA 1940–1990 (1990, British West Indies Airways)
 The Point Lisas Story (1991, Media & Editorial Projects)
 Going to Ground: Journalism 1972–1992 (1994, Prospect Press)
 A Black & White Book (2003, Prospect Press)
 Introduction, Trinidad & Tobago: Carnival Land Water People by Alex Smailes (2006, Macmillan)
 Introduction, In the Public Eye by Joanne Kilgour Dowdy (2009, Commess University Press)

References

External links 
 Media & Editorial Projects Ltd (MEP)
 Jeremy Taylor: Notes from Port of Spain

20th-century male writers
British emigrants to Trinidad and Tobago
Living people
People educated at King's Ely
Trinidad and Tobago journalists
Trinidad and Tobago male writers
Year of birth missing (living people)